McKee is a home rule-class city located in the Commonwealth of Kentucky. It is the seat of Jackson County, KY. As of the 2020 census, the population of the city was 803. The city was founded on April 1, 1882 and was named for Judge George R. McKee. In 2019, the city held a vote regarding the sale of alcohol, which passed, making the city wet.

Geography
McKee is located in the central part of Jackson County, within the Daniel Boone National Forest. U.S. Route 421 passes through the center of town, leading northwest 34 miles to Richmond and southeast 29 miles to Manchester. Kentucky Route 89 runs north from McKee 28 miles to Irvine and southwest 24 miles to Livingston, while Kentucky Route 290 leads south from McKee 9 miles to Annville.

According to the United States Census Bureau, the city has a total area of 2.33 square miles, of which 0.3 acres or 0.02%, are water. The city sits in the valley of Pigeon Roost Creek, which joins Birch Lick Creek at the western end of the city to form Indian Creek, a southwest-flowing tributary of the Middle Fork of the Rockcastle River, part of the Cumberland River watershed.

Outdoor recreation

Public parks 

 Bond Memorial Park
 Jackson County Veterans Park
 McKee City Park
 Jack Gabbard Park

Lakes and reservoirs 

 McKee Reservoir

Trails 

 Sheltowee Trace National Recreation Trail
 Big Turtle Trail

National protected areas 

 Daniel Boone National Forest
 Mill Creek Wildlife Management Area

Events

Jackson County Fair & Homecoming 
This event is held annually on the Friday and Saturday before Labor Day. Festivities include 4-H craft exhibits, music entertainment, clogging, vendors, food trucks, and a parade.

Sheltowee Trace Artisans Fair 
Local and guest artisans from across the state come to teach, demonstrate, and sell their crafts at this event, which is held during the first weekend in May.

Demographics

As of the 2020 census, there were 803 people residing in the town. The racial makeup of the city was 97.65% White, 1.03% Black or African American, and 1.31% from two or more races. Hispanic or Latino of any race were 0.85% of the population. The median age of residents was 40.9 years.

The median income for a household in the town was $20,061, and the median income for a family was $21,289. About 40% of the population were below the poverty line. 

The median rental price in the city was $338 a month and the median house value was $107,000.

Economy 
The Jackson County - McKee Industrial Development Authority (JCMIDA) assists with economic development efforts in the county. The authority manages several industrial parks within Jackson County, one of which is located in McKee.

Major employers located in the city include:

 Jackson County Public Schools
 Peoples Rural Telephone Cooperative (PRTC)
 Jackson County Fiscal Court
 Umine LLC.

Utilities 
Power in McKee is served by Jackson Energy, which is headquartered in the city and serves Jackson County and surrounding counties such as Lee County, Owsley County, Clay County, Laurel County, Rockcastle County, and Madison County. Cable TV, internet, and phone in McKee is served by Peoples Rural Telephone Cooperative, which is also headquartered in the city and serves Jackson County, Owsley County, and Clay County. McKee Water and Sewer also serves residents in the city.

Healthcare 
McKee does not have a hospital. Nearby facilities include Saint Joseph Hospital (Berea), Baptist Health Hospital (Richmond), Advent Health (Manchester), Saint Joseph Hospital (London) and, Rockcastle Regional Hospital. (Mt. Vernon)

Emergency medical services for McKee are provided by the Jackson County Ambulance Service. McKee does have a few primary care facilities which include the White House Clinic, McKee Medical Clinic, and Advent Health.

Education

Public education 
The city is served by the Jackson County Public School system. The following schools operate within the city:

 McKee Elementary School
 Jackson County Middle School
 Jackson County High School
 Jackson County Area Technology Center

Public Library 

 Jackson County Public Library.

References

 

Cities in Jackson County, Kentucky
County seats in Kentucky
Populated places established in 1882
Cities in Kentucky